Terrance O'Neil Knighton (born July 4, 1986) is an American football coach and former defensive tackle. He was drafted by the Jacksonville Jaguars in the third round of the 2009 NFL Draft after playing college football at Temple. Knighton is nicknamed "Pot Roast" and "Mutton Chop" by his teammates. He has also played for the Denver Broncos, Washington Redskins and spent time with the New England Patriots prior to the 2016 NFL season.

High school career
Knighton attended Windsor High School in Connecticut, where he played both tight end and defensive line, and was teammates with Chris Baker. He earned All-State honors from the coaches association and Hartford Courant All-Area accolades in 2003. He was also a basketball varsity member, earning All-CCC West League honors.

In 2004, he attended Milford Academy in New Berlin, New York, where he again played on both sides of the ball. He made 70 tackles and six sacks in 2004.

Considered a three-star recruit by Rivals.com, Knighton chose Temple University after being denied admission to UCF, the only two scholarship offers he received.

College career
As a true freshman at Temple, Knighton played in 10 games as a reserve before earning a start in the season finale at Navy. For the year, he registered 17 tackles (10 solo), 3.5 TFLs and one forced fumble.

Knighton became a regular starter as a sophomore, and made 57 tackles (32 solo), 6.5 TFLs, three sacks, two FFs, two QBHs and four PBUs over the season. As a junior, he finished the season with 8.5 TFL and a team-best three fumble recoveries.

A team captain as a senior in 2008, Knighton finished the season with 54 tackles, including 35 solos, five break-ups, a team-best three fumble recoveries, a hurry, and blocked kick, and a sack. He became Temple's first First Team All-MAC honoree in school history.

Professional career

2009 NFL Draft
Despite an up-and-down career, Knighton's draft stock had risen quickly after strong workouts. He was selected in the third round (72nd overall) by the Jacksonville Jaguars, which was considered a "gamble" or a "reach" by most commentators. Sports Illustrated's Tony Pauline described Knighton as "an athletic defensive tackle who struggles with weight issue", and who "has too much downside for a mid-third-round choice".

Jacksonville Jaguars
Knighton was signed by the Jaguars to a four-year contract on July 31, 2009. His contract, which includes veteran minimum salaries, plus a fourth-year escalator to $1.3 million, could reach nearly $3.32 million. He also received a signing bonus of $843,500. At the end of the 2009 season, Coach Jack Del Rio said, "Terrance Knighton is going to be a real good player. It wasn't an accident before the game that he was made a team captain for the game. I'm counting on him to lead the way."

Knighton's career was placed in jeopardy by a serious injury to his eyeball in a bar incident on April 8, 2012. Knighton was able to recover from the incident however, and returned to the field wearing a dark visor at all times.

On November 16, 2012, Knighton was fined $21,000 for a late hit against the Indianapolis Colts on Week 10.

He became a free agent after the 2012 season.

Denver Broncos
On March 13, 2013, Knighton was signed to two-year contract by the Denver Broncos, where his former Jacksonville coach Jack Del Rio was the defensive coordinator at that time. In his first season with Denver, Knighton recorded 31 tackles, 3 sacks, a fumble recovery and an interception. In the AFC Championship Game, Knighton sacked Tom Brady on a crucial 4th down. His efforts helped the Broncos enter Super Bowl XLVIII, their first postseason finals game in almost 15 years, but lost to the Seattle Seahawks 43-8.

When the Broncos signed DeMarcus Ware in March 2014, Knighton changed his jersey number from 94 to 98 in order for Ware to have it. Ware previously wore number 94 for nine seasons with the Dallas Cowboys.

Washington Redskins
On March 12, 2015, Knighton signed a one-year, $4 million contract with the Washington Redskins. He played in 15 games for the Redskins in 2015.

New England Patriots
On March 31, 2016, Knighton signed a one-year, $4.5 million contract with the New England Patriots. Knighton was released on August 29, 2016.

Retirement
On April 12, 2017, Knighton announced his retirement from the NFL to pursue a career in coaching.

NFL awards and honors
Football Futures All-Rookie Team (2009)
Pro Football Weekly All-Rookie Team (2009)
Sporting News All-Rookie Team (2009)

Coaching career
Knighton joined the coaching staff at Wagner in 2019 as defensive line coach. He joined the Carolina Panthers coaching staff as a coaching assistant in 2021.

Personal life
Knighton earned the nickname Pot Roast when former Jaguars linebacker Clint Ingram overheard Knighton’s meal order on a road trip. He has been childhood friends with Cincinnati Bengals defensive end Chris Baker since high school, where the two of them were teammates. The two would be teammates again for one season in their professional careers when Knighton signed with the Redskins in 2015. Knighton also served as Baker's best man in his wedding to ESPN talent producer, Jamila Phillips.

In 2009, he visited the NFL-YET center in Jacksonville with teammates Cecil Newton and Julius Williams to sign autographs and provide Thanksgiving dinner for 30 families.

Knighton suffered an eye injury during a late night incident at a Jacksonville nightclub. He temporarily lost vision and required surgery to remove a cataract that formed for protection. His vision slowly returned.

Knighton appeared in a series of commercials for Bridgestone tires, including "Empty Fridge" and "Treadmill."

References

External links
New England Patriots bio
Washington Redskins bio
Denver Broncos bio
Jacksonville Jaguars bio
Temple Owls bio

1986 births
Living people
Players of American football from Hartford, Connecticut
Sportspeople from Hartford, Connecticut
American football defensive tackles
Temple Owls football players
Jacksonville Jaguars players
Denver Broncos players
Washington Redskins players
New England Patriots players
Wagner Seahawks football coaches
Carolina Panthers coaches